The speckled longfin eel, Australian long-finned eel or marbled eel (Anguilla reinhardtii) is one of 15 species of eel in the family Anguillidae. It has a long snake-like cylindrical body with its dorsal, tail and anal fins joined to form one long fin. It usually has a brownish green or olive green back and sides with small darker spots or blotches all over its body. Its underside is paler. It has a small gill opening on each side of its wide head, with thick lips. It is Australia's largest freshwater eel, and the female usually grows much larger than the male. It is also known as the spotted eel.

Description
Long-finned eels can grow to 1.6 metres and 22 kg (although generally to 1 metre) for females while males are much smaller at 650 mm and 600 g.  Landlocked eels have been reported to grow to 3 metres (10 feet).

Distribution
The long-finned eel is a native of New Guinea, eastern Australia (including Tasmania), Lord Howe Island, and New Caledonia.  It can be found in many freshwater areas, including creeks, streams, rivers, swamps, dams, lagoons, and lakes although generally more often in rivers than lakes.

Breeding and migration
Like other Anguilla species, the eel lives predominantly in freshwater rivers and streams, but is born in deep waters of the ocean. Each species has its own spawning grounds; spawn use ocean currents to return to their adult species range. The long-finned eel spawns in the Western arm of the Southern Equatorial Current, which carries spawn to the eastern coast of Australia. This species is panmictic, spawning throughout the year.

References

 
 Critters of Calamvale Creek
 Inland Fisheries Service Tasmania Long-finned eel fact sheet
 AUSECO
 Royal Forest and Bird Protection Society

Anguillidae
Freshwater fish of New Zealand
Freshwater fish of Australia
Taxa named by Franz Steindachner
Fish described in 1867